The president of the Republic of Kazakhstan is the head of state of the Republic of Kazakhstan and the commander-in-chief of the Armed Forces of the Republic of Kazakhstan. The president is the holder of the highest office within the Republic of Kazakhstan. The powers of this position are described in a special section of the Constitution of Kazakhstan.

The position was established on 16 December 1991, after independence of the country. The current president is Kassym-Jomart Tokayev. He became acting president on 20 March 2019 due to the resignation of Nursultan Nazarbayev.

Symbols

The president of Kazakhstan's decorations include a breast mark and a presidential standard. Unlike Presidents of most countries, they also have a military rank insignia.

Presidential standard
The standard of the president of Kazakhstan is similar to the national flag in that it is rectangular in shape with a ratio of 1:2. In the centre of the standard is the Emblem of Kazakhstan. It is bordered on three sides with golden fringe.

The current presidential standard has been in service as recently as 2012. The former standard, which was used from 1995 to 2012, was a light blue rectangle there with a golden circle in which the figure of the young Kazakh leader Sakas riding a snow leopard.

Altyn Qyran Order
The Order of the Golden Eagle ( or Altyn Qyran Order) is the highest civilian award that can be awarded by the president of Kazakhstan. Its purpose is to recognize outstanding service to the country by Kazakh and foreign citizens. As head of state, the president is de facto Commander special class of the Order of Altyn Kyran.

President in the Constitution
Item 5 of Article 42 of the Constitution determines that no one can be elected president more than two terms in a row, before 2022 constitutional amendments it also stated that "The present restriction shall not extend on the First President of the Republic of Kazakhstan." 

Article 46 says that the president's "honor and dignity shall be inviolable" and that their expenses shall be paid by the state. Item 4 of the article outlines the special status and authority of the first president, and refers to a special constitutional act for definitions.
According to this act, the first president possesses total, absolute and termless immunity for all actions they perform while in office, and that they remain a government official until their death. They also retains the ability to speak to the people of Kazakhstan, keeps guards, communication, transport, and state support of their activity, and that their official apartment and summer residence became their property with official maintenance. They are also provided with medical care, sanatorium, pensions and insurance.

On April 26, 2015, Nursultan Nazarbayev was re-elected for his 5th presidential term. The official ceremony of the inauguration took place at the Palace of Independence in Astana on April 29. At the inauguration ceremony the re-elected president assured the nation that he would continue the 5 institutional reforms that he had offered earlier, which would contribute to the consistent growth and development of the country.

On January 25, 2017, President Nursultan Nazarbayev laid the groundwork for reforms to the constitution that would redistribute executive powers to the parliament and ministries for the purpose of more open and efficient governance.

Presidential Administration

The Presidential Administration of Kazakhstan (Kazakh: Қазақстан Республикасы Президентінің Әкімшілігі/Russian: Администрация Президента Республики Казахстан) reports directly to the president and aids him/her in their everyday dates. It was established in accordance of Presidential Decree No. 2565 on October 20, 1995. It is currently based at the Ak Orda Presidential Palace in the capital city of Astana. Prior to that, it was based in Almaty.

Latest election

Kazakhstan's seventh presidential election was held on November 20, 2022.

List of presidents of Kazakhstan

Rank by time in office

See also
 Vice President of Kazakhstan
 Prime Minister of Kazakhstan
 Kazakh presidential inauguration

Notes

References

External links

 Official website of Kazakhstan President Nazarbayev
 Kazakhstan President Nazarbayev Biography

Politics of Kazakhstan
Government of Kazakhstan
 
Kazakhstan
President
1990 establishments in the Kazakh Soviet Socialist Republic